The French Quarter is an official city-designated district of Philadelphia spanning the area between 17th and 19th Streets east and west and Walnut and Sansom Streets from north to south.  The designation was made official in 1999.  According to City Paper, the Philadelphia French Quarter "... is one of the few places outside France that supports a thriving French culture" even though "it remains largely unrecognized by both tourists and natives".  The area is closely tied to the culture of Rittenhouse Square.

History
In 1999, in advance of the Republican National Convention the following year, the city added subtle orange signs saying "French Quarter" below the traditional green streets signs in the area. The designation is a tribute to the French culture that has shaped Philadelphia and is based on the establishment of three French restaurants and a creperie in the area in the 1990s.

References

Ethnic enclaves in Pennsylvania
French-American culture in Pennsylvania
French communities
Neighborhoods in Philadelphia
Center City, Philadelphia
Urban quarters in the United States